Heshahangcheng is a Shanghai Metro station in Pudong New Area, Shanghai. It opened on 29 December 2013.

Exit list 
 Exit 1: Helei Road

References 

Railway stations in Shanghai
Line 16, Shanghai Metro
Shanghai Metro stations in Pudong
Railway stations in China opened in 2013